Otto Bossart (born 26 October 1876) was a Swiss footballer who played as defender for FC Basel in the 1890s.

Football career
FC Basel was founded on 15 November 1893 and Bossart joined the club a year later before their 1894–95 season.

Bossart played his first game for the club in the home game in the Stadion Schützenmatte on 22 September 1894 as Basel won 2–0 against FC Gymnasia.

Bossart played for the club for two seasons and during this time he played 21 games for Basel without scoring a goal.

Notes

Footnotes

References

Sources
 Rotblau: Jahrbuch Saison 2017/2018. Publisher: FC Basel Marketing AG. 
 Die ersten 125 Jahre. Publisher: Josef Zindel im Friedrich Reinhardt Verlag, Basel. 
 Verein "Basler Fussballarchiv" Homepage
(NB: Despite all efforts, the editors of these books and the authors in "Basler Fussballarchiv" have failed to be able to identify all the players, their date and place of birth or date and place of death, who played in the games during the early years of FC Basel.)

FC Basel players
Swiss men's footballers
Association football defenders
1876 births
Date of death missing